Ningwu–Jingle railway or Ningjing railway, is a single-track regional railroad in Shanxi Province of northern China between Ningwu and Jingle. The Ningwu to Huabeitun section began commercial operation in 2000 and the Huabeitun to Jingle section followed in 2008. The line is primarily used by trains carrying coal.

Rail connections
Ningwu: Datong–Puzhou railway, Ningwu–Kelan railway

See also
 List of railways in China

References

Railway lines in China
Rail transport in Shanxi
Railway lines opened in the 1990s